Aleksandar Glintić (born April 19, 1976) is a Serbian former professional basketball player.

Playing career 
Glintić played for the youth system of Bosna and got promoted to the first team in 1991. Before the Bosnian War, he moved to Belgrade in 1992. In 1992, he signed for Partizan where he stayed for two seasons without a lot of opportunity to play. After leaving Partizan, he played for Belgrade-based teams Beovuk 72 and Beobanka. In the summer 2000, he returned to Partizan. He played for two seasons and won a Yugoslav League and a Yugoslav Basketball Cup in 2002.

After leaving Partizan, he played one season for OKK Beograd. In 2003, he signed a one-year deal with the Bulgarian team Lukoil Academic. In February 2005, he signed the contract with Igokea for the rest of the season. In August 2005, he signed a contract with Greek team Iraklis Thessaloniki, but left them at the end of October. In January 2007, he returned to Serbia and signed for Vizura, where he played for a year and a half. His last season he played for in the Romanian team U Cluj-Napoca.

International career 
Glintić was a member of the FR Yugoslavia national under-22 team that won the gold medal at the 1997 World Championship for 22 and Under in Australia. Over seven tournament games, he averaged 9.0 points, 5.9 rebounds and 0.3 assists per game. Also, he won the bronze medal at the 1998 European Championship for 22 and Under in Italy. Over eight tournament games, he averaged 6.8 points, 4.2 rebounds and 0.2 assists per game.

Glintić won the bronze medal at the 1997 Mediterranean Games in Bari, Italy.

Career achievements and awards

Club 
 Yugoslav League champion: 1 (with Partizan: 2001–02)
 Yugoslav Basketball Cup winner: 2 (with Partizan: 1993–94, 2001–02)

National team
 1997 World Championship for 22 and Under: 
 1997 Mediterranean Games: 
 1998 European Championship for 22 and Under:

References

External links
 Player Profile at eurobasket.com
 Statistics at fibaeurope.com

1976 births
Living people
Basketball League of Serbia players
Bosnia and Herzegovina expatriate basketball people in Serbia
Centers (basketball)
Iraklis Thessaloniki B.C. players
KK Beobanka players
KK Beovuk 72 players
KK Partizan players
KK Igokea players
KK Vizura players
OKK Beograd players
PBC Academic players
Serbian men's basketball players
Serbian expatriate basketball people in Bulgaria
Serbian expatriate basketball people in Greece
Serbian expatriate basketball people in Romania
Serbs of Bosnia and Herzegovina
People from Travnik
Mediterranean Games medalists in basketball
Mediterranean Games bronze medalists for Yugoslavia
Competitors at the 1997 Mediterranean Games
Yugoslav Wars refugees